Nourseothricin (NTC) is a member of the streptothricin-class of aminoglycoside antibiotics produced by Streptomyces species. Chemically, NTC is a mixture of the related compounds streptothricin C, D, E, and F.  NTC inhibits protein synthesis by inducing miscoding. It is used as a selection marker for a wide range of organisms including bacteria, yeast, filamentous fungi, and plant cells.  It is not known to have adverse side-effects on positively selected cells, a property cardinal to a selection drug.

NTC can be inactivated by nourseothricin N-acetyl transferase (NAT) from Streptomyces noursei, an enzyme that acetylates the beta-amino group of the beta-lysine residue of NTC. NAT can thus act as an antibiotic resistance gene.

Properties 
NTC is highly soluble in water (~ 1 g/mL) and stable in solution for 2 years at 4 °C.

References

Aminoglycoside antibiotics
Eukaryotic selection compounds